Isidro Martinez (born March 15, 1997) is an American soccer midfielder who plays for Forward Madison FC of USL League One.

Career

Youth and college 
Martinez attended Simon Rivera High School in Brownsville, Texas. His senior year he led the Raiders to an undefeated 28-0-0 record on their way to the UIL 6A Texas state championship. In the championship match, Martinez scored the opening goal as the Rivera Raiders won 2–1. At the end of the season, Martinez was named the 2015 USA Today Gatorade Texas Boys Soccer Player of the Year.

Martinez played four years of college soccer at the University of Texas Rio Grande Valley between 2015 and 2018, making 70 appearances, scoring 9 goals and tallying 13 assists.

While at college, Martinez appeared for USL Premier Development League side South Georgia Tormenta in 2018.

Professional 
On March 8, 2019, Martinez signed for USL Championship side Rio Grande Valley.

On January 4, 2021, Martinez joined USL Championship side New Mexico United. 

Martinez returned to Rio Grande Valley FC on February 4, 2022.

Martinez signed with Forward Madison FC of USL League One prior to the 2023 season.

Career statistics

References

External links 
  UTRGV bio
  RGVFC Toros bio

1997 births
Living people
American soccer players
Association football midfielders
People from Brownsville, Texas
Soccer players from Texas
UT Rio Grande Valley Vaqueros men's soccer players
Tormenta FC players
Rio Grande Valley FC Toros players
New Mexico United players
Forward Madison FC players
USL Championship players
USL League One players
USL League Two players